Michael McLaughlin may also refer to:

 Michael McLaughlin (activist) (born c. 1940), British far-right activist.
 Michael McLaughlin (author) (1948–2002), American cookbook writer
 Michael McLaughlin (pianist), on the 2003 album The Unknown Masada
 Bo McLaughlin (Michael Duane McLaughlin, born 1953), American baseball relief pitcher
 Mike McLaughlin (born 1956), American racing driver
 Mike McLaughlin (American football) (born 1987), American football fullback for the Denver Broncos